Broadway Pier in Downtown San Diego, California, is located on San Diego Bay at the intersection of Broadway and North Harbor Drive. It houses one of San Diego's two cruise ship terminals.

History
Built in 1913, the pier has a long history of servicing passenger vessels. The  pier was the first of San Diego's reinforced concrete piers found on the bay. It has been operated by the Port of San Diego since 1962.

In the 1970s, the Broadway Pier was remodeled by San Diego architecture firm Innis-Tennebaum architects' Donald Innis. It was designed and configured so that a person looking down Broadway could still see the bay (this is no longer the case with the new remodeled structure that was built in its place). Its innovative 1970s remodeling also originally featured planter boxes with trees and foliage, which was one of the first of its type of above-water structures to do this. The pier was featured as a location in the 1979 film Hardcore directed by Paul Schrader and starring George C. Scott  (standing in as Los Angeles) and was also the location for the big, splashy 2003 premiere party for the Academy Award winning Russell Crowe film Master and Commander: The Far Side of the World a film directed by Peter Weir. In 2010, the 1970s version of the Broadway Pier building was demolished and a modern cruise ship terminal was erected in its place.

References

External links
 

Piers in California
San Diego Bay
Tourist attractions in San Diego
Transportation buildings and structures in San Diego
1913 establishments in California